Sensitive may refer to:

 Mister Sensitive, Murat Demir, a fictional character
 Psychic, a person who professes an ability to perceive information through extrasensory perception
 "Sensitive" (song), a 1989 song by The Field Mice
 "Sensitive", a 2022 song by Meghan Trainor from the album Takin' It Back
 "Sensitive", a 1983 song by Re-Flex from the album The Politics of Dancing
 "Sensitive", a 2016 song by Robbie Williams from the album The Heavy Entertainment Show

See also
 
 
 Sensitivity (disambiguation)